The 1988 AFC Asian Cup Final was a football match which determined the winner of the 1988 AFC Asian Cup, the 8th edition of the AFC Asian Cup, a quadrennial tournament contested by the men's national teams of the member associations of the Asian Football Confederation.

Venue

Al-Ahli Stadium also known as Hamad bin Khalifa Stadium located in Doha, Qatar, hosted the 1988 AFC Asian Cup Final. The 18,000-seat stadium is used by Al Ahli SC (Doha) and Al-Sailiya SC. It was one of two stadiums used to host the 1988 Asian Cup; twelve matches were played in the stadium including the final.

Route to the final

Match

Final

References

External links 
 

Final
Saudi Arabia national football team matches
South Korea national football team matches
1988 in Qatar
1984
December 1988 sports events in Asia
Sports competitions in Qatar
Association football penalty shoot-outs